The Fuzz is the only album by The Fuzz and was released in 1971.  It reached #43 on the US R&B album chart and #196 on the Billboard 200 chart.

The album featured three singles: "I Love You for All Seasons", which reached #10 on the R&B chart, "Like an Open Door", which reached #14, and "I'm So Glad" which reached #35.

Track listing
All songs written by Sheila Young except where noted.
 "I Think I Got the Making of a True Love Affair" (Prelude) – 2:32
 "I Think I Got the Making of a True Love Affair" (Joe Tate/Young) – 2:29
 "I'm So Glad" (Prelude) – 0:42
 "I'm So Glad" (Tate/Young) – 2:41
 "All About Love" (Prelude) – 0:45
 "All About Love" (Tate/Young) – 2:53
 "It's All Over" (Prelude) – 0:44
 "It's All Over" – 3:33
 "Like an Open Door" – 2:27
 "Search Your Mind" (Matthew Allen) – 3:05
 "Leave It All Behind Me" – 3:00
 "Ooh Baby Baby" (Smokey Robinson/Warren Moore) – 5:32
 "I Love You for All Seasons" – 2:55

Personnel
Carr-Cee Productions – producer
Joe Tate – arranger

Charts

Singles

References

1971 debut albums